Highton is a suburb of Geelong, Victoria, Australia

Highton may also refer to:

Highton (surname)
Highton Glacier, a glacier of the South Shetland Islands
Highton (Saga of the Skolian Empire)
 Highton, Pennsylvania